John Okehurst (fl. 1397) was an English politician.

He was a Member (MP) of the Parliament of England for Chichester in September 1397.

References

Year of birth missing
Year of death missing
English MPs September 1397